Depsages is a genus of beetle in the family Cerambycidae. Its only species is Depsages granulosa. It was described by Félix Édouard Guérin-Méneville in 1831.

References

Pteropliini
Beetles described in 1831